Camp Rock is a 2008 American television film.

Camp Rock may also refer to:

 Camp Rock (soundtrack), from the 2008 film
 Camp Rock (Virginia), a summit in Virginia, US

See also
 Camp Rock Enon, a Boy Scouts of America summer camp
 My Camp Rock, a singing competition based on the 2008 film, with separate competitions in several countries
 Rock Camp (disambiguation)